Dniprodzerzhynsk Steel Plant or Stalzavod is a metallurgical enterprise in Kamianske, Dnipropetrovsk Oblast, Ukraine. The steel plant is a subsidiary of PJSC Dniprovahonmash.

References

Companies established in 1926
Steel companies of Ukraine
Kamianske
1926 establishments in Ukraine